The 2010 Bonnaroo Music and Arts Festival was  held on June 10–13, 2010. The line-up was announced Tuesday, February 9, although the original line-up release date was scheduled for February 2. It was broadcast live on YouTube. Pre-sale tickets went on sale November 27, 2009.

Line-up

The majority of artists were announced on Bonnaroo's official MySpace and Twitter pages over a span of nine hours. On March 4, Ween, John Butler Trio, Umphrey's McGee, Galactic, The Gossip, and Circa Survive were added to the line-up. On March 11, it was announced that Conan O'Brien would stop at the festival during The Legally Prohibited from Being Funny on Television Tour. Recordings of Tenacious D's performance on June 11 were released for free on the Live Music Archive.

Thursday, June 10
(artists listed from earliest to latest set times)

This Tent:
The Entrance Band
Here We Go Magic
Miike Snow
The Dodos
Mayer Hawthorne and the County
Wale
That Tent:
The Postelles
Diane Birch
Local Natives
Neon Indian
The Temper Trap
The xx
The Other Tent:
Fanfarlo
Baroness
Manchester Orchestra
Needtobreathe
Blitzen Trapper
Lotus
The Comedy Theatre:
J. B. Smoove with Julian McCullough & Rob Cantrell (2 Sets)
Margaret Cho with Baron Vaughn & John Roberts (2 Sets)
Cinema Tent:
Short Circuit
Corey Haim Rules: The Lost Boys
Green Screens presented by Rock the Earth: Gasland / The World Ocean: Trashed
Countdown to Zero
Adult Swim's Aqua Teen Hunger Force
The Raspberry Brothers: The Karate Kid
The Hangover
Jaws 3-D
When You're Strange: A Film About The Doors
Troo Music Lounge hosted by Budweiser
Joe Robinson
The Non-Commissioned Officers
Frontier Ruckus
Elizabeth Cook
Sarah Jarosz
Tiny Animals
Frank Turner
The Constellations
Joshua James
Solar Stage:
Hunab Kru Breakdancing
Gypsy Hands Tribal Dance
The Wildrovers
Jaik Willis
African Drum and Dance by Mawre & Company
Bonnaroo Beard & Mustache Competition
Jonathan Sexton and the Big Love Choir
African Drum and Dance by Mawre & Company
Poetix / Hunab Kru Breakdancing
RhythMystik Tribal Percussion
The Silent Disco Powered by Vitaminwater:
DJ Equal
Gypsyphonic Disko
Eclectic Method
Jared Dietch
The Lunar Stage:
Green Day: Rock Band Experience
2010 NBA Finals Game 4
Dieselboy
LA Riots
Afrojack
Sharam

Friday, June 11
(artists listed from earliest to latest set times)

What Stage:
Mighty Clouds of Joy
Damian Marley & Nas
Tenacious D
Kings of Leon
Which Stage:
Trombone Shorty & Orleans Avenue
The Gaslight Anthem
Umphrey's McGee
The National
Michael Franti & Spearhead
The Flaming Lips & Stardeath and White Dwarfs perform The Dark Side of the Moon
This Tent:
Julia Nunes
Jay Electronica
Gossip
She & Him
Tori Amos
Bassnectar
LCD Soundsystem
That Tent:
Punch Brothers featuring Chris Thile
Carolina Chocolate Drops
Hot Rize
The Nitty Gritty Dirt Band
Steve Martin and the Steep Canyon Rangers
The Black Keys
Kid Cudi
B.o.B
The Other Tent:
Tokyo Police Club
Edward Sharpe & the Magnetic Zeros
Dr. Dog
OK Go
Les Claypool
Daryl Hall & Chromeo
Galactic
Sonic Stage:
The Entrance Band
Diane Birch
Elizabeth Cook
Steep Canyon Rangers
Punch Brothers
Carolina Chocolate Drops
Disco Biscuits
Umphrey's McGee
Hot Rize
Lotus
The Comedy Theatre:
Conan O'Brien
Margaret Cho with Baron Vaughn & John Roberts (2 Sets)
Jeffrey Ross Roasts Bonnaroo with Chelsea Peretti
Cafe Where?:
Jill Andrews
The RBC
Boy Crisis
Alyssa Bonagura
Samantha Crain
Cinema Tent:
Super Fly
Conan O'Brien (Live Feed from The Comedy Theatre)
The Raspberry Brothers: Footloose
Rock the Earth Q&A: Sarah Bush and Anne Bedarf
Salva Tres Palmas
Adult Swim's Childrens Hospital
Adult Swim's Robot Chicken
Shaun of the Dead
Zombieland
Inglourious Basterds
Troo Music Lounge hosted by Budweiser:
Jessie Baylin
The Young Veins
Kevin Devine
Nneka
The Bridge
The Moondoggies
Dawes
The Bakerton Group
Warpaint
Royal Bangs
Solar Stage:
Shiloh Circle
Gypsy Hands Tribal Dance
Rock the Earth Panel Discussion "Social Change Through Music"
The Poetix Vanguard
Rock the Earth Interview & Performance Diane Birch
Rock the Earth Interview & Performance Special Guest
Josh Phillips Folk Festival
Bonnaroo Beard & Mustache Competition
African Drum and Dance by Mawre & Company
Joshua James
Here's To the Long Haul
The Poetix Vanguard
Hunab Kru Breakdancing
Gypsy Hands Tribal Dance
Miss Lolly Pop's Burlesque Coterie
The Silent Disco Powered by Vitaminwater:
Motion Potion
Eclectic Method
DJ Equal
DJ Logic
The Lunar Stage:
Live Screening of Conan O'Brien from The Comedy Theatre
The Beatles: Rock Band Experience
Eclectic Method
Hercules and Love Affair (DJ Set)
The Crystal Method
Mark Knight
Lee Burridge

Saturday, June 12
(artists listed from earliest to latest set times)

What Stage:
Big Sam's Funky Nation
Jimmy Cliff
The Dead Weather
Stevie Wonder
Jay-Z
Which Stage:
Rebelution
Baaba Maal
Norah Jones
The Avett Brothers
Weezer
This Tent:
Circa Survive
Isis
Melvins
Jeff Beck
Dan Deacon Ensemble
Deadmau5
That Tent:
Langhorne Slim
Brandi Carlile
Dave Rawlings Machine
Mumford & Sons
John Prine
Thievery Corporation
Disco Biscuits
The Other Tent:
Bomba Estéreo
Mexican Institute of Sound
Nortec Collective Presents Bostich and Fussible
Aterciopelados
Los Amigos Invisibles
Ozomatli
Clutch
GWAR
Sonic Stage:
Dawes
The Postelles
Julia Nunes
Bomba Estéreo
Big Sam's Funky Nation
Imelda May
Clutch
Brandi Carlile
Aterciopelados
Circa Survive
The Comedy Theatre:
Conan O'Brien
Jeffrey Ross Roasts Bonnaroo with Chelsea Peretti
Aziz Ansari, Nick Kroll, Paul Scheer & Rob Huebel
Benson / Burnham / Giraldo featuring Chelsea Peretti
Cafe Where?:
Imelda May
Morning Teleportation
Angus & Julia Stone
Cinema Tent:
180 South
Conan O'Brien (Live Feed from The Comedy Theatre)
Green Screens: Ryan Stasik (Umphrey's McGee) / Q&A Monnie Monteleone
When You're Strange: A Film About The Doors
The Secret To A Happy Ending (Drive-By Truckers Documentary)
The Decemberists: Here Come the Waves
Adult Swim's Childrens Hospital
The Hangover
Footloose
Short Circuit
Troo Music Lounge hosted by Budweiser:
Jonathan Tyler and the Northern Lights
Elmwood
Truth & Salvage Co.
Paper Tongues
Red Cortez
The Middle East
Harper Simon
Jonathan Sexton & The Big Love Choir
Lissie
Solar Stage:
The Wildrovers
Hunab Kru Breakdancing
Rock the Earth Panel Discussion "Social Change Through Music"
The Poetix Vanguard
RhythMystik Tribal Percussion
Rock the Earth Interview Baaba Maal
Rock The Earth Interview & Performance Julia Nunes
The Poetix Vanguard
Bonnaroo Beard & Mustache Competition
Ogya
African Drum and Dance by Mawre & Company
Jill Andrews
The Poetix Vanguard
Hunab Kru Breakdancing
Gypsy Hands Tribal Dance
Miss Lolly Pop's Burlesque Coterie
The Silent Disco Powered by Vitaminwater:
DJ Logic
DJ Equal
Motion Potion
The Lunar Stage:
World Cup: England v. USA
The Beatles: Rock Band Experience
Eclectic Method
Danny Howells
Kaskade
Timo Maas

Sunday, June 13

(artists listed from earliest to latest set times)

What Stage:
John Butler Trio
John Fogerty
Zac Brown Band
Dave Matthews Band
Which Stage:
Tinariwen
Calexico
Regina Spektor
Ween
Phoenix
This Tent:
Japandroids
Lucero
Against Me!
Dropkick Murphys
Rise Against
That Tent:
Monte Montgomery
Cross Canadian Ragweed
Jamey Johnson
Kris Kristofferson
Miranda Lambert
The Other Tent:
Ingrid Michaelson
Martin Sexton
Blues Traveler
They Might Be Giants
Medeski Martin & Wood
Sonic Stage:
Truth & Salvage Co.
Danny Barnes
Orgone
Harper Simon
Medeski Martin & Wood
Martin Sexton
John Butler
Cross Canadian Ragweed
Monte Montgomery
Blues Traveler
The Comedy Theatre:
Aziz Ansari, Nick Kroll, Paul Scheer & Rob Huebel
Benson / Burnham / Giraldo featuring Chelsea Peretti
Aziz Ansari, Nick Kroll, Paul Scheer & Rob Huebel (2 Sets)
Cafe Where?:
Danny Barnes
How I Became The Bomb
Mike Posner
Cinema Tent:
Love Noise
Green Screens by Rock the Earth: The Cove with John Popper, Joseph Chisolm, Charles Hamberton
Infantree: Food for Thought
Exit Through the Gift Shop
Adult Swim's Tim and Eric's Check It Out!
The White Stripes: Under Great White Northern Lights
Country First
Inglourious Basterds
Troo Music Lounge hosted by Budweiser:
The Devil Makes Three
Caitlin Rose
Tamarama
Supagroup
Space Capone
Everest
Orgone
Solar Stage:
Ogya
African Drum and Dance by Mawre & Company
Rock the Earth Panel Discussion "Social Change Through Music"
The Poetix Vanguard
Rock The Earth Interview & Performance Here's to the Long Haul
Rock the Earth Interview & Performance Special Guest
Rock the Earth Interview & Performance Danny Barnes
The Poetix Vanguard
Bonnaroo Beard & Mustache Competition
Hunab Kru Breakdancing
Gypsy Hands Tribal Dance
Josh Phillips Folk Festival
Gypsy Hands Tribal Dance
The Silent Disco Powered by Vitaminwater:
Motion Potion
The Lunar Stage:
World Cup: Germany v. Australia
Green Day: Rock Band Experience
2010 NBA Finals Game 5

Notes
As in 2009, no Superjam took place. It returned in 2011.

References

Bonnaroo Music Festival by year
2010 in American music
2010 music festivals
Bonnaroo
2010 in Tennessee
June 2010 events in the United States